Rootville may refer to:
Rootville, California, alternate name of Fort Miller, California
Rootville, New York
Rootville, Pennsylvania